Paradisia may refer to:

 Paradisia Alpine Botanical Garden, also known as Giardino Alpino Paradisia or Jardin alpin Paradisia, a nature preserve and botanical garden in the Gran Paradiso National Park in Cogne, Italy
 Paradisia, a 1987 film by Marcy Page
 Paradisia, a fictional planet featuring in season 3 of Galactik Football
 "Paradisia", a song by Björk from the 2017 album Utopia

See also
 Paradeisia, Arcadia, a village and a community in the municipality of Megalopoli, Greece
 Paradisea (paradise lily), a European genus of flowering plants
 Paradisio, a Belgian eurodance group
 Paradiso (disambiguation)